Dildar Atmaca (born 17 October 2002) is a German footballer who plays as a winger for Preußen Münster.

Career statistics

References

2002 births
German people of Turkish descent
Sportspeople from Bielefeld
Footballers from North Rhine-Westphalia
Living people
German footballers
Association football forwards
Hannover 96 players
Arminia Bielefeld players
Würzburger Kickers players
SC Preußen Münster players
3. Liga players
Oberliga (football) players
Regionalliga players